Deca- (and dec-) sometimes deka- is a common English-language numeral prefix derived from the Late Latin  ("(set of) ten"), from Ancient Greek , from  (déka, "ten").  It is used in many words.

General
 Decathlon, a combined event in athletics consisting of ten track and field events.
 Decennial, ten-yearly or a celebration of ten years.

Mathematics
 Decimal based on the number ten.
 Decagon a plane figure with ten sides
 Decahedron a  polyhedron with ten faces

Chemistry
 Decane, a hydrocarbon with 10 carbon atoms

Biology
 Decapoda, an order of crustaceans with ten feet

Religion
 The Decalogue, the Ten Commandments

See also
 Deca-, use in the SI system

References

Biological nomenclature
Chemistry prefixes
Prefixes